Special Olympics USA is a sports organization for children and adults with intellectual disabilities in the United States. It is part of the global Special Olympics movement. Special Olympics was founded in 1968 with the main goal of accepting and welcoming individuals as they are. Special Olympics provides year-round training in Olympic based sports and is based in 204 countries.

Special Olympics USA Games
The Special Olympics USA Games is a national Special Olympics event held every four years in the United States.

2006 Special Olympics USA Games
The first, quadrennial, USA National Games were held July 1–8, 2006, in Ames, Iowa. The city of Ames and Iowa State University hosted over 3,000 athletes from all 50 states in 13 sports, including aquatics, basketball, bocce, bowling, golf, artistic gymnastics, rhythmic gymnastics, powerlifting, soccer, softball, tennis, track and field, and volleyball. Over 8,000 volunteers were needed to make this event run smoothly.  Actor Tom Arnold, originally from Iowa, was the Master of Ceremonies for the Opening Ceremonies, and several other celebrities were at the event as well, including NFL quarterback Kurt Warner and actor Brandon Routh, both also Iowans.

2010 Special Olympics USA Games
Lincoln, Nebraska hosted the Games, July 18–23.

2014 Special Olympics USA Games
The 2014 Special Olympics USA Games were held from June 14–21 in New Jersey.  The Opening Ceremony was held at Prudential Center in Newark. Competition was held at venues throughout Mercer County including The College of New Jersey in the Trenton suburb of Ewing, Rider University, Princeton University and Mercer County Park.  The budget for the event exceeded $15M.  The Games Founding Partners included 21st Century Fox, Barnabas Health, HESS, KPMG, NJSEA, Prudential, PSE&G, ShopRite, Toys"R"Us and WWE.

Baseball was introduced as a sport at the USA Games for the first time, with four teams – from Alabama, Delaware, New Jersey, and Rhode Island. The gold– and bronze–medal games were played in Arm & Hammer Park in Trenton.

The triathlon was held for the first time.

2018 Special Olympics USA Games
The 2018 Special Olympics USA Games were held in Seattle, Washington from July 1–6, 2018. The USA Games featured more than 4,000 athletes competing in 14 different sports. The Opening Ceremony took place on July 1 at Husky Stadium and included a 2,000-person choir and musical performances from Ann Wilson and Charlie Puth. The sporting events were held primarily on the University of Washington campus and in various venues around the region.

2022 Special Olympics USA Games 
The 2022 Special Olympics USA Games were held in Orlando, Florida, from June 5-11, 2022. The USA Games featured 5,500 athletes and coaches from all 50 states and The Caribbean. The opening ceremony was held on June 5th at Exploria Stadium and was produced by Disney Live Entertainment featuring performances from Sara Bareilles and others.

2026 Special Olympics USA Games

The 2026 Special Olympics USA Games will be held in the Minneapolis-St. Paul Area. Most events will be held at the University of Minnesota campus.

See also
Flame of Hope (Special Olympics)
Special Olympics World Games

References

External links
Special Olympics official website
North America Region (Canada, the Caribbean, and the U.S.). Special Olympics official website
2006 Special Olympics USA National Games official website
2010 Special Olympics USA National Games official website
2014 Special Olympics USA National Games official website

Special Olympics
SPECIAL
United States Special
Multi-sport events in the United States
United States at multi-sport events
Parasports in the United States
Recurring sporting events established in 2006
2006 establishments in the United States